In organic chemistry the addition of the prefix benzo to the name of a chemical compound indicates the addition of an even number of carbon atoms to an unsaturated or already aromatic compound by which a new aromatic ring is formed. Between the prefix benzo and the name of the parent compound then place of the addition of the extra carbon atoms is indicated by letters written between square brackets. Quite often the number of added carbon atoms is four, although sometimes two else will do the job as shown in the following table. The first entry also shows different routes to the name of the same molecule.

Examples

See also
Benzodiazepine

References

Benzoid and non benzoid compoundss